BlazBlue: Continuum Shift is a 2009 fighting game developed by Arc System Works as an official sequel to BlazBlue: Calamity Trigger. As with the previous game, the game first came to arcades before both the Xbox 360 and PlayStation 3 versions as the game was currently released for the Taito Type X2 arcade system board, with a 16:9 ratio and 768p resolution.

Revisions entitled BlazBlue: Continuum Shift II and BlazBlue: Continuum Shift Extend were released in arcades in 2010–2011. They were later ported to the PlayStation 3, PlayStation Portable, Nintendo 3DS, and Windows.

Gameplay
BlazBlue: Continuum Shift retains the traditional 2D fighter gameplay of two characters participating in a duel on a two dimensional plane. A match can consist of one to five rounds known as "rebels". To win a round, one player must either deplete the other one's life gauge to 0 by inflicting enough damage through various attacks or by having more remaining health after the round's timer depletes.

During each rebel, players fill a Heat Gauge which can be used for advanced techniques such as Distortion Drives, Rapid Cancels, Counter Assaults, and certain characters' attacks (Jin/Hakumen). The Heat Gauge can be filled via dealing damage, taking damage, and perfectly blocking attacks. However, some mechanics from the previous installment have been changed or completely replaced in the transition.

The Guard Libra system which utilizes a tug-of-war gauge has been replaced with the new Guard Primer point system. Each character has a certain number of points (e.g. Tager has a maximum of 10 primer points while characters like Carl or Ragna have 4 and 5 respectively). These points are depleted whenever moves with "Guard Break" properties (e.g. Jin's "Gale" or Hakumen's "Forward C") are blocked. Upon depletion of all points, the character is immobilized for a certain period of time known as Guard Crush. Barrier blocking can be used at critical times to prevent a Guard Crush by consuming 50% of the Barrier gauge instead. Primer points regenerate over time or after all points are depleted.

Barrier Burst has been replaced with Break Burst, a similar ability but with different penalties. Break Burst can only be performed twice in a single match, and its second use only becomes available if the player lose a round. It no longer permanently drains the character's Barrier Gauge or gives the player the "Danger" penalty. A free unused burst is required for Astral Heats. Bursts have different properties depending on when they are used, as the offensive "Gold Burst" has high bounce and combo-ability, while the defensive "Green Burst" will provide invincibility for the entire burst motion, at the cost of permanently halving the character's maximum primer points. All lost primer points due to Green Bursts will not recover until the next round.

The conditions to use an Astral Heat, a flashy finishing move, have also been changed. Instead of requiring it to be the final round, having 100% Heat, and an opponent having 20% health or less, it now only requires it to be the player's match point round and an opponent being within 35% health, in addition to the aforementioned requirement of one free burst.

The game has undergone several gameplay mechanic from its predecessor. Continuum Shift features at least eight new characters: Tsubaki Yayoi and Hazama (from the Arcade version), Mu-12 (Console-exclusive), Makoto Nanaya, Valkenhayn R. Hellsing, Platinum the Trinity and Relius Clover (the later four released via DLC); Lambda-11 replaces the character Nu-13; and rebalances previous characters with new or tweaked moves. The game also features all-new character select art, new and returning gameplay modes, and continues the story.

Plot
The game is set after the events of BlazBlue: Calamity Trigger. A few days have passed since the reported raid by Ragna the Bloodedge, The 13th Hierarchical City "Kagutsuchi" forgets to celebrate New Years, as his alleged involvement in the "Mysterious Bombing" and "Huge Pentacle Sightings" becomes the talk of the town. With the NOL offering no official explanation, the citizens voice their own theories, exaggerating and spreading rumors like wildfire. Completely indifferent to the state of the city, Ragna grips his massive sword and quietly bides his time—waiting for the chance to achieve his true objective, and then, the enormous "power" that has ensnared Ragna begins to activate...

Characters

All 12 characters from BlazBlue: Calamity Trigger return in Continuum Shift. This brings the total roster to 20 playable characters. Characters introduced in Continuum Shift include:

 Tsubaki Yayoi: Jin and Noel's childhood relative/friend from the Military Academy and a member of the NOL's 0 Division. She describes as a straight A student, with a rather sensitive personality. She is very serious and reserved, and is a member of the dignified Yayoi family.
 Hazama : The shady captain of NOL's Intelligence Division and Noel's supervisor who appeared as a NPC in Calamity Trigger, later revealed to be an artificial human created to house the spirit of Yuki Terumi, one of the Six Heroes and the series antagonist, before becoming his own person by the event of Central Fiction.
 Lambda-11 (Λ-11- / Λ -No. 11-): An imitation Murakumo Unit created by Kokonoe by combining the body of the 11th experimental replica of Saya with the soul of Nu-13, recovered after falling into the Gates of Sheol. Kokonoe completely erased her memory and as a result, Lambda-11 is only interested in carrying out Kokonoe's orders. Despite Kokonoe's efforts, Lambda still possesses feelings for Ragna.
Introduced in console release
 Mu-12  (μ-12- / μ -No. 12-): Noel, upon having her true powers awoken. She is a perfect Murakumo Unit who possesses Kusanagi and has a goal Terumi wished for: Destruction of the Sankishin Unit: Amaterasu and the world. However, in Central Fiction, Mu took on Noel's characteristics and became a separate character. It's because that Noel was Amaterasu all along using Mu as a host body like how Terumi used Hazama as a vessel.
Introduced as DLC characters in console release
 Makoto Nanaya: Another Military Academy classmate and one of Noel's best friends and a talking squirrel, She is quite hyperactive with a short attention span. This is a DLC character that was released on PSN and Xbox Live Marketplace on August 3, 2010.
 Platinum the Trinity: A young girl with two personalities named Luna (a rude, unkind girl) and Sena (a polite, young boy) which flawless switch at a moment's notice. Like Hazama, Platinum is an artificial being created to house the soul of Trinity Glassfield of the Six Heroes. The character was released on 10 May for the Xbox 360, and 12 May for the PlayStation 3.
 Valkenhayn R. Hellsing: Initially a NPC in Calamity Trigger, he is one of the Six Heroes who served the Alucard family for generations, elderly in appearance yet protective of Rachel. The character was released on September 29 in the US and on September 21 in Japan for the PlayStation 3. Valkenhayn was released for the Xbox 360 on December 7 after a substantial delay.
Introduced in Extend update
 Relius Clover: Hazama's partner in crime, Relius is Carl Clover's father and a Colonel in the NOL's R&D department. He is also the creator of the Murakumo Units and for Ada being Nirvana. He created her a copy, using his wife, Ignis.

Release 
BlazBlue: Continuum Shift was originally released for the Japanese arcades on November 20, 2009.  A console version was released in Japan in 2010 along with a region-exclusive Limited Edition. Two of its updated versions were later released, which are also available for PlayStation Portable, Nintendo 3DS, and PlayStation Vita.

The console port is arcade perfect and includes new stages, the Legion Mode from the PSP version of Calamity Trigger, and revamped versions of the original stages. There is also new Tutorial and Challenge modes similar to Street Fighter IV that help teach players the basics of the game's system. Additionally, the game will be patchable for character balance, with the first patch expected to be released within six months of the initial release date. This version includes a brand-new console-exclusive character: Mu-12, the true form of Noel Vermillion, as a new secret boss character and unlockable fighter: newcomer Makoto, released on August 3, 2010.

The Japanese version was released on July 1 with Japanese voice acting only. The standard edition was released in the United States on July 27, 2010, and included English and Japanese voice acting. A Limited Edition was released in Japan which includes a petit Nendoroid of Noel, a mini-script replica of the story, a visual book and a super picture label. European publishers Zen United have confirmed in an interview with Neo Empire that Europe will be getting a Limited Edition version of Continuum Shift. The limited edition includes a 96-page art book and eight art cards depicting various fighters and combos.

For a limited time, a Fan Edition was released on the Zen United store limited to 500 copies which included the Limited Edition of Continuum Shift, along with the Makoto DLC Code, the Noel Nendoroid, an art print by UDON and Marvel Comics artist Alvin Lee and a Taokaka mouse-pad. However, in the United States, American publisher Aksys decided to not release a Limited Edition of the game due to time constraints and production lead times. The game's theme song is ), performed by KOTOKO.

BlazBlue: Continuum Shift II

The first arcade revision of Continuum Shift, entitled BlazBlue: Continuum Shift II, was released in arcades on December 9, 2010. It features all the console exclusive characters, numerous balance changes, and other cosmetic changes such as a new announcer.

Toshimichi Mori, the game's producer, confirms that Continuum Shift II was released as a free downloadable update for both PlayStation 3 and Xbox 360 versions of BlazBlue: Continuum Shift on May 10, 2011, for both the Japanese and English Xbox 360 versions and on May 12, 2011, for the Japanese PlayStation 3 version. The PS3 US version was released on May 17, 2011, and the European version was released on May 25, 2011.

The PlayStation Portable and Nintendo 3DS ports of the game, released in Japan on March 31, 2011, include all the characters released as downloadable content (Makoto Nanaya, Valkenhayn R. Hellsing, and Platinum the Trinity) with possible new story elements for them, a new mode called "Abyss", and balance tweaks as well.

A software update for the Japanese arcade version of Continuum Shift II was released on July 15, 2011. It included changes in the display of player information at the VS screen and also allowed for Calamity Trigger stages to be used in tournament play. Another update was released during the winter of 2011 and includes several new balance changes and one new character, Relius Clover.

BlazBlue: Continuum Shift Extend

BlazBlue: Continuum Shift Extend (originally titled BlazBlue: Continuum Shift II Plus) was announced for the PlayStation Vita at E3 2011, and was later confirmed to be slated for the PlayStation 3 and Xbox 360 as well. The game features an updated version of Calamity Trigger's Story Mode called Blazblue Calamity Trigger Reconstruction; the inclusion of Relius Clover as a playable character; four new stories for Platinum, Makoto, Valkenhayn, and Relius; a new Unlimited Mars game mode; hidden Distortion Drives for every playable character's Unlimited form; and further balance tweaks. In addition, the game also includes a new opening animation produced by Production I.G. as well as new theme song called  by Faylan. Aksys has also released Continuum Shift Extend internationally.

A version for the game for the PlayStation Portable was released on May 31, 2012, in Japan. This version features an exclusive BBQ (BlazBlue Quiz) Mode not found in the other versions. However, while the other versions have full online play, the PSP version is limited to ad-hoc, with support for two to four players. On November 14, 2014, it was confirmed by Korean studio H2 Interactive that the game would be receiving a port to Valve's digital store, Steam, to be released on December 11, 2014, with online play intact, unlike the Steam port of Calamity Trigger which had the netplay removed possibly due to the game's usage of Games for Windows – Live.

In Japan, BlazBlue: Continuum Shift Extend sold 3,982 copies on PSP.

Reception

Gaming Bus awarded the game a B+, citing as pros great tutorials, Abyss Mode, storyline, gameplay, difficulty adjustment, Stylish Mode makes game accessible to new players, online gameplay, a balanced versus mode, and the soundtrack. It did note, however, that Unlimited Mars isn't really accessible to new players, the game requires much faster reaction times than Marvel or Street Fighter, the learning curve can be a bit steep when learning to play against humans, and that the game will not appeal to those turned off by anime character designs.

References

External links
BlazBlue: Continuum Shift
BlazBlue: Continuum Shift II
 
BlazBlue: Continuum Shift Extend
 

2009 video games
2D fighting games
Fighting games used at the Evolution Championship Series tournament
Arcade video games
Arc System Works games
BlazBlue
Fighting games used at the Super Battle Opera tournament
Multiplayer and single-player video games
Nintendo 3DS games
Nintendo 3DS eShop games
PlayStation 3 games
PlayStation Portable games
PlayStation Vita games
NESiCAxLive games
Fighting games
Video games developed in Japan
Windows games
Xbox 360 games

ja:BLAZBLUE